Korestia is a municipal unit of Kastoria municipality in Kastoria regional unit, Western Macedonia, Greece. The municipal unit has an area of 122.281 km2. Population 672 (2011). The seat of the former municipality was in Makrochori.

References

Former municipalities in Western Macedonia
Populated places in Kastoria (regional unit)

bg:Костур (дем)